Chichagov or Chichagof(f) (masculine) or Chichagova (feminine) is a Russian surname. Notable people with the surname include:

Pavel Chichagov (1767–1849), a Russian military and naval commander in the Napoleonic Wars
Seraphim Chichagov (b.? - 1937), martyr and Father Superior of the Monastery of Saint Euthymius
Vasily Chichagov (1726–1809), an admiral in the Russian Navy
Nikolai Chichagov (1803-1858), Russian architect
Dmitrii Chichagov (1835-1894), Russian architect
Olga and Galina Chichagova (1886-1958 and 1891-1966), Russian artists and children's book illustrators

See also
Chichagof Harbor, an inlet on Attu Island in the Aleutian Islands in Alaska
Chichagof Island in the Alexander Archipelago of the Alaskan Panhandle
Russian ship Chichagoff, a ship in the service of Russian America in the early 19th century

Russian-language surnames